The term launch control can refer to:

Launch control (automotive), an automotive control option
A spaceport, a rocket launch site
A missile launch control center, used to launch US ICBMs
Launch control (rocketry), generic term for a control center used to launch rockets and missiles

There are also specific facilities that use the name Launch Control:
Launch Control Center at Kennedy Space Center

See also

 
 Launch (disambiguation)
 Control (disambiguation)